The Beetle is a 1919 British silent horror film directed by Alexander Butler and starring Leal Douglas, Maudie Dunham, Hebden Foster and Fred Morgan. It was based on the 1897 novel The Beetle: A Mystery by Richard Marsh.

The 1897 novel went into print a few months after Bram Stoker's Dracula hit bookshelves, and it outsold Dracula at the time. It has since passed into relative obscurity, although it seems to have served as Stoker's inspiration for his 1903 The Jewel of Seven Stars, which also involved an ancient Egyptian princess reincarnating into the body of a modern-day woman. Director Alexander Butler went on to an acting role in the similarly themed 1925 film She.

Jonathan Rigby has called Leal Douglas’s High Priestess “the polymorphous title role”.

Plot
An Ancient Egyptian princess (Leal Douglas) transforms herself into a beetle in order to gain revenge on Paul Lessingham, a British Member of Parliament. The creature can change its form, appearing as a man, a woman or a beetle. Lessingham seeks the aid of another man, who is a rival for the affections of a young woman they love, to aid him in his fight against the supernatural being that is haunting him.

Cast
 Leal Douglas as High Priestess
 Maudie Dunham as Dora Greyling
 Hebden Foster as Paul Lessingham
 Fred Morgan as Neces
 Frank Reade as Sidney Atherton
 Rolf Leslie as Holt
 Nancy Kenyon as Marjorie Lindon

References

Bibliography
 Low, Rachael. History of the British Film, 1918-1929. George Allen & Unwin, 1971.
 Rigby, Jonathan. English Gothic: A Century of Horror Cinema. Reynolds & Hearn, 2004.

External links

1919 films
1919 horror films
1910s fantasy films
British horror films
British silent feature films
Films directed by Alexander Butler
Films based on British novels
Films set in London
British black-and-white films
1910s English-language films
1910s British films
Silent horror films